Nicholas Boyle FBA (born 18 June 1946) is an English literary critic. He is the emeritus Schröder Professor of German at the University of Cambridge and a fellow of Magdalene College, Cambridge. He has written widely on German literature, intellectual history and religion and is known particularly for his award-winning extensive biography of Goethe (of which two of a projected three volumes have been published). Boyle became a fellow of the British Academy in 2000.

Boyle's biography of Goethe currently runs to two volumes and he is writing the third. George Steiner has called him a 'critic of vivacious perspicacity' and compares the scope of his work to "Lord Bullock's double portraits of Hitler and Stalin, Richard Holmes's Coleridge, David Cairns's Berlioz, Michael Holroyd's Shaw, Richardson's Picasso", whilst The New York Times Book Review describes his biography as a 'remarkable achievement', adding that 'there is nothing comparable to this study in any language'. The biography has been translated into German by Holger Fliessbach. The Goethe Institut awarded Boyle their Goethe Medal in 2000. The second volume was shortlisted for the British Academy Book Prize in 2001.

He lives in Cambridge with his wife and four children.

Financial Times letter 
In 2017, one of Boyle's letters to the Financial Times went viral. In the letter, Boyle responded to a Big Read article ("Braced for the fall") published on 5 July 2017. In the article, it was stated that the pro-Brexit wing of the Conservative Party are to be known as 'fuckers', while their opponents are to be known as 'wankers'. Boyle opined that "this rhetoric inverts the truth", as "it is the Europhobes who shut themselves away in self-gratifying fantasies, while the Remainers know that real life is possible only through interaction with others". 

Boyle's letter was described as outstanding and the "letter of the decade" by editor Lionel Barber, and was shared across multiple online platforms.

Bibliography
 Nicholas Boyle, Martin Swales and Joseph Peter Stern (eds.), Realism in European literature: essays in honour of JP Stern (Cambridge: Cambridge University Press, 1986)
 Nicholas Boyle, Goethe: Faust Part One (Cambridge: Cambridge University Press, 1986)
 Nicholas Boyle, Goethe: The Poet and the Age: Volume I: The Poetry of Desire (1749–1790) (Oxford: Oxford University Press, 1991)
 Introduction to Selected works: including The Sorrows of Young Werther, Elective Affinities, Italian Journey, Faust New York: A.A. Knopf, 2000, 1999. Everyman's Library #246
 Nicholas Boyle, Who Are We Now?: Christian Humanism and the Global Market from Hegel to Heaney (Continuum, 2000)
 Nicholas Boyle, Goethe: The Poet and the Age Volume II: Revolution and Renunciation, 1790–1803 (Oxford, Clarendon Press, 2000)
 Nicholas Boyle and John Guthrie (eds.) Goethe and the English-speaking World (Boydell and Brewer, 2002)
 Nicholas Boyle, Sacred and Secular Scriptures: A Catholic Approach to Literature (University of Notre Dame Press, 2004)
 Nicholas Boyle, German Literature: A Very Short Introduction (Oxford: Oxford University Press, 2008)
 Nicholas Boyle, 2014 – How to Survive the Next World Crisis (Continuum Books, 2010)

References

External links
 Boyle's Profile at the University of Cambridge Department of German and Dutch
 'More than just an old Romantic' Review of Goethe: The Poet and the Age Vol II by George Steiner, The Guardian,30 January 2000.
 Review of Goethe: The Poet and the Age Vol II by R. Stephenson, Modern Language Review 97 pp. 484–487.

English literary critics
Literary critics of German
Fellows of Magdalene College, Cambridge
Fellows of the British Academy
Alumni of Magdalene College, Cambridge
Living people
1946 births
Johann Wolfgang von Goethe
Members of the Göttingen Academy of Sciences and Humanities